Cationic amino acid transporter 4 is a protein that in humans is encoded by the SLC7A4 gene.

See also

References

Further reading

Solute carrier family